The 1964 NCAA Skiing Championships were contested at the Cannon Mountain Ski Area in Franconia Notch, New Hampshire at the eleventh annual NCAA-sanctioned ski tournament to determine the individual and team national champions of men's collegiate alpine skiing, cross-country skiing, and ski jumping in the United States.

Denver, coached by Willy Schaeffler, captured their eighth, and fourth consecutive, national championship, edging out host Dartmouth in the team standings.

Venues

This year's championships were held in New Hampshire, with the alpine events at Cannon Mountain, near Franconia Notch, and the nordic events at Dartmouth Skiway, near Lyme.

The eleventh edition, these were the second NCAA championships in New Hampshire (1958 at Dartmouth Skiway) and the fourth in the East; the other two (1955, 1961) were in Vermont.

Originally scheduled for March 5–7 at Dartmouth Skiway, rain forced a move of the alpine events to nearby Vermont at Mount Ascutney, and again to Cannon Mountain; the nordic events were held at Dartmouth on Friday. The downhill was replaced with a giant slalom on Saturday morning, followed by a slalom in the afternoon, both won by John Clough of Middlebury.

Team scoring

Individual events

Four events were held, which yielded seven individual titles.
Thursday: Downhill (cancelled, rain)
Friday: Cross Country, Jumping 
Saturday: Giant slalom, Slalom

 ^ A giant slalom replaced the weather-cancelled downhill

See also
List of NCAA skiing programs

References

NCAA Skiing Championships
NCAA Skiing Championships
NCAA Skiing Championships
NCAA Skiing Championships
NCAA Skiing Championships
NCAA Skiing Championships
NCAA Skiing Championships
Skiing in New  Hampshire